Spur is a feature on Earth's Moon, a crater in the Hadley–Apennine region.  Astronauts David Scott and James Irwin visited it in 1971, on the Apollo 15 mission, during EVA 2.  Spur was designated Geology Station 7.

Spur is located on the north slope of Mons Hadley Delta, about 200 m above the plain to the north.  It is east of the much larger St. George crater, and about 5 km south of the Apollo 15 landing site itself.

The astronauts found the "Genesis Rock", sample 15415, at Spur.  The sample contains a large clast of anorthosite, and Dave Scott said "Guess what we just found! I think we found what we came for" as he examined the sample.  They also found samples 15445 and 15455, so-called black and white breccias, which are thought to be impact melt breccia resulting from the Imbrium basin impact event.

The crater was named by the astronauts, and the name was formally adopted by the IAU in 1973.

Gallery

Samples
The following samples were collected from Spur crater (Station 7), as listed in Table 5-II of the Apollo 15 Preliminary Science Report.  Sample type, lithology, and description are from Table 5-IV of the same volume.

External links
 Apollo 15 Traverses, Lunar Photomap 41B4S4(25)

References

Impact craters on the Moon